The Lidl Unihockey Prime League is the highest league in Swiss floorball.

Between the season 2007/08 and 2012/13 the league was called Swiss Mobiliar League (SML). It was named after the insurance company Mobiliar. 

Since the Season 2022/23 it is called Lidl Unihockey Prime League (L-UPL). Prior to 2007 and between 2013 and 2022 it was called Nationalliga A (NLA).   

The men's L-UPL is composed of twelve teams and the women's league of ten teams (eight until season 2016/17). The lower league is called National League B. The champions of both leagues are eligible to compete at the Champions Cup.

Men's League

Teams 
Teams in 2022/23 season:
 Unihockey Basel Regio
 Chur Unihockey
 Floorball Köniz
 Grasshopper Club Zürich
 HC Rychenberg Winterthur
 SV Wiler-Ersigen
 Tigers Langnau
 UHC Alligator Malans
 Floorball Thurgau
 UHC Uster
 Waldkirch-St. Gallen
 Zug United

Past Champions 
Champions in past seasons:

 1984 – UHC Urdorf
 1985 – UHT Zäziwil
 1986 – UHC Giants-Kloten
 1987 – UHT Zäziwil
 1988 – UHT Zäziwil
 1989 – UHC Rot-Weiss Chur
 1990 – UHC Rot-Weiss Chur
 1991 – UHC Rot-Weiss Chur
 1992 – UHC Rot-Weiss Chur
 1993 – UHC Rot-Weiss Chur
 1994 – UHC Rot-Weiss Chur
 1995 – UHC Rot-Weiss Chur
 1996 – UHC Rot-Weiss Chur
 1997 – UHC Alligator Malans
 1998 – UHC Rot-Weiss Chur
 1999 – UHC Alligator Malans
 2000 – UHC Rot-Weiss Chur
 2001 – UHC Rot-Weiss Chur
 2002 – UHC Alligator Malans
 2003 – UHC Rot-Weiss Chur
 2004 – SV Wiler-Ersigen
 2005 – SV Wiler-Ersigen
 2006 – UHC Alligator Malans
 2007 – SV Wiler-Ersigen
 2008 – SV Wiler-Ersigen
 2009 – SV Wiler-Ersigen
 2010 – SV Wiler-Ersigen
 2011 – SV Wiler-Ersigen
 2012 – SV Wiler-Ersigen
 2013 – UHC Alligator Malans
 2014 – SV Wiler-Ersigen
 2015 – SV Wiler-Ersigen
 2016 – GC Zürich
 2017 – SV Wiler-Ersigen
 2018 – Floorball Köniz
 2019 – SV Wiler-Ersigen
 2020 – the season was cancelled
 2021 – Floorball Köniz
 2022 – Grasshopper Club Zürich

Women's League

Teams 
Teams in 2021/22 season:
 FB Riders DBR
 Kloten-Dietlikon Jets
 piranha chur
 Red Ants Winterthur
 Skorpion Emmental Zollbrück
 UH Red Lions Frauenfeld
 UHC Laupen ZH
 Unihockey Berner Oberland
 Wizards Bern Burgdorf
 Zug United

References

External links 
 NLA Men on swissunihockey.ch
 NLA Women on swissunihockey.ch

Floorball competitions in Switzerland
1983 establishments in Switzerland
Sports leagues established in 1983